MacFarland is a surname, and may refer to:

Frank Mace MacFarland (1869–1951), American malacologist
Sean MacFarland, American general officer
Tony MacFarland (born 1982), Mexican actor and television show host

See also
McFarland (surname)
McFarlane (surname)
McFarlan (disambiguation)